The 2022 Open Città della Disfida was a professional tennis tournament played on clay courts. It was the 22nd edition of the tournament which was part of the 2022 ATP Challenger Tour. It took place in Barletta, Italy between 11 and 17 April 2022.

Singles main-draw entrants

Seeds

 1 Rankings are as of 4 April 2022.

Other entrants
The following players received wildcards into the singles main draw:
  Luca Nardi
  Oleksandr Ovcharenko
  Francesco Passaro

The following players received entry into the singles main draw as alternates:
  Evgeny Karlovskiy
  Jelle Sels
  Alexander Shevchenko

The following players received entry from the qualifying draw:
  Matteo Arnaldi
  Luciano Darderi
  Titouan Droguet
  Francesco Forti
  Lucas Gerch
  Miljan Zekić

Champions

Singles

 Nuno Borges def.  Miljan Zekić 6–3, 7–5.

Doubles

 Evgeny Karlovskiy /  Evgenii Tiurnev def.  Ben McLachlan /  Szymon Walków 6–3, 6–4.

References

Open Città della Disfida
2022
April 2022 sports events in Italy
2022 in Italian sport